Peter Bol may refer to:

Peter Bol (historian) (born 1948), American historian and sinologist
Peter Bol (runner) (born 1994), Australian middle-distance runner